KHAQ (98.5 FM) is a radio station broadcasting a Classic rock format. Licensed to Maxwell, Nebraska, United States, the station is currently owned by Armada Media - Mccook, Inc and features programming from Waitt Radio Networks.

History
The station was assigned the call letters KJKI on 2000-02-23. On 2000-08-30, the station changed its call sign to KRKU. On 2008-08-11, the station changed its call sign to the current KHAQ.

References

External links

HAQ
Classic rock radio stations in the United States
Radio stations established in 2000